NBC 8 may refer to one of the following television stations in the United States:

Current affiliates
KAIT-DT2, Jonesboro, Arkansas
KGNS-TV, Laredo, Texas
KGW, Portland, Oregon
KOBR, Roswell, New Mexico
Satellite of KOB in Albuquerque
KOMU-TV, Columbia/Jefferson City Missouri
KSBW, Monterey/Salinas/Santa Cruz, California
KSNK, McCook, NE
Re-broadcasts KSNW in Wichita, Kansas
KULR-TV, Billings, Montana
KUAM-TV, Hagåtña, Guam
PJA-TV, Oranjestad, Aruba
WFLA-TV, Tampa, Florida
WGAL-TV, Lancaster, Pennsylvania
WLIO, Lima, Ohio
WOOD-TV, Grand Rapids, Michigan

Formerly affiliated
 KHNL, Honolulu, Hawaii (was branded as NBC 8 from 1996 to 2009)
 KIFI-TV, Pocatello/Idaho Falls, Idaho (1961 to 1996)
 WAGM-TV, Presque Isle, Maine (primarily affiliation from 1957 to 1959)
 WBGH-CD, Binghamton, New York (was on channel 8 from 1997 to 2001)
 WDAZ-TV, Grand Forks, North Dakota (1967 to 1983 via WDAY-TV in Fargo)
 WFAA, Dallas, Texas (1950 to 1957)
 WROC-TV, Rochester, New York (1962 to 1989)
 WXEX-TV (now WRIC-TV), Richmond, Virginia (1955 to 1965)
 WYCN-LD, Boston, Massachusetts (2016 to 2019)